Prospere is a surname. Notable people with the surname include:

 Alleyn Prospere (born 1979), Saint Lucian cricketer
 Alfred Prospere, Saint Lucian politician